is a district located in Shimane Prefecture, Japan.

As of 2003, the district has an estimated population of 17,879 and a density of 27.79 persons per km2. The total area is 643.38 km2.

Towns and villages
Tsuwano
Yoshika

Mergers
On September 25, 2005 the town of Nichihara merged into the town of Tsuwano.
On October 1, 2005 the town of Muikaichi and the village of Kakinoki merged to form the new town of Yoshika.

Districts in Shimane Prefecture